Culladia assamella is a moth in the family Crambidae. It was described by Stanisław Błeszyński in 1970. It is found in Assam, India.

References

Crambini
Moths described in 1970
Moths of Asia